Displacement chess is a family of chess variants in which a few pieces are transposed in the initial standard chess position. The main goal of these variants is to negate players' knowledge of standard chess openings.

Variations 
The following variations were tried in master or grandmaster tournaments: 
 White's king and queen are transposed. This arrangement was tried in a correspondence tournament in 1935 with the participation of grandmaster Paul Keres.
This variant is sometimes called Mongredien chess, after Augustus Mongredien, the sponsor of a tournament held in London during 1868 under the auspices of the British Chess Association, in which several strong British players took part, including Joseph Henry Blackburne. According to David Pritchard, this is one of the most popular forms of displacement chess.
 The knights and bishops are transposed.
 The rooks and bishops are transposed. This array was suggested by J. R. Capablanca after his match with Emanuel Lasker, but did not become popular. This variant is also called Fianchetto chess.
 PP random chess: the kings remain on e1 and e8, one of the rooks must remain on the a- or h-file, and the bishops are placed on opposite-colored squares. Proposed in computer chess-playing client Chess4Net by Pavel Perminov.

References

External links 
 D-Chess.com
 "Fischer Random Chess Game in 1875 by Wilhelm Steinitz", ChessCentral.com. Blackburne–Potter: Displacement chess game (knights and bishops are transposed)

Chess variants